The Illusionist: Music from the Motion Picture is the official soundtrack to the 2010 animated film The Illusionist. The album was released through Milan Records and Warner Bros. Records on 14 December 2010. The songs on the record were either or orchestrated by the film's director, Sylvain Chomet, or performed by Malcolm Ross under the fictional band name The Britoons. It was generally well received, with particular praise for the songs' storytelling and its "effortless" sound.

Background and development 
Bob Last, a co-producer of the film, introduced Chomet to Malcolm Ross, a Scottish musician who was previously a part of the band Josef K.

Composition 
The soundtrackIn "Chanson Illusionist", voice impersonations of Juliette Gréco, Les Frères Jacques, Georges Brassens, Barbara, Yves Montand, Édith Piaf, Jacques Brel, and Serge Gainsbourg are performed by an ensemble of voice actors.

Critical reception 

The soundtrack received generally positive reviews from music critics. William Ruhlmann from AllMusic claimed that the record was functional and "serve[d] the small-scale, melancholy treatment of the story" well. Tampa Bay Times Steve Persall described the album as a "small marvel of music hall tunes" and congratulated Chomet for allowing the dialogue to be freely interpreted. According to Michael Phillips of the Chicago Tribune, the ending result is effortless and acclaimed the track "Chanson Illusionist" for being a "gentle waltz".

Track listing

Release history

References 

2010 soundtrack albums
Milan Records soundtracks
Warner Records soundtracks